Tomzhangsa Gewog (Dzongkha: སྟོང་མི་གཞང་ས་) is a gewog (village block) of Trashiyangtse District, Bhutan. It was formerly known as Tomzhangtshen.

References

Gewogs of Bhutan
Trashiyangtse District